The choirs at Brigham Young University (BYU) consist of four auditioned groups: BYU Singers, BYU Concert Choir, BYU Men's Chorus, and BYU Women's Chorus. Each choir is highly accomplished and performs from an extensive repertoire. Together, the choirs have recorded and released over 30 albums. The choirs perform frequently throughout the academic year, both as individual ensembles as well as a combined group.

BYU Singers

Brigham Young University Singers is an exciting choir with impressive voices and a wide range of styles. Conducted by Dr. Andrew Crane, the group performs pieces from nearly every musical genre as well as many original works written or arranged for the choir.

In May 2022, BYU Singers received multiple first place prizes at the 22nd International Stasys Šimkus Choir Competition (Klaipėda, Lithuania), including the Grand Amber award for best choir. In 2021, the group placed first in the mixed choir category, and earned the overall Gran Prix award in the International Youth Choir Festival “Aegis Carminis” (Koper, Slovenia). The ensemble will next compete in the 53rd Tolosa (Spain) Choral Contest in October 2022.

As the university’s flagship touring choir, they have given concerts in some of the most prestigious venues in the world, including Carnegie Hall in New York City, the Kennedy Center in Washington, D.C., the Sydney Opera House and Town Hall, the Kauffman Center in Kansas City, the Hanoi Opera House, the Kapella in St. Petersburg, the Musikverein in Vienna, and the Walt Disney Concert Hall in Los Angeles. They have traveled throughout the United States and to 27 countries including Russia, Germany, Switzerland, Italy, England, Egypt, 

Australia, Ghana, Ireland, China, Indonesia, Vietnam, and the Baltic states. The choir was the United States representative at the Fourth World Choral Symposium in 1996, performed at the inaugural conference of the National Collegiate Choral Organization in 2006, and participated in the 2009 Cork International Choral Festival, where they received the PEACE Award, an honor given to the audience’s favorite choir. BYU Singers has performed numerous times at state, national, and regional conferences of the American Choral Directors Association, National Association for Music Education, and National Collegiate Choral Organization since 1985. The choir appeared on national television in four programs created for the Corporation for Public Broadcasting. BYU Singers was founded in 1984 by Ronald Staheli.

BYU Singers consists of around 40 students pursuing a variety of graduate and undergraduate degrees in such areas as statistics, accounting, social science, engineering, and music.

BYU Concert Choir

The BYU Concert Choir is a mixed chorus of approximately 90 men and women. The group performs a wide variety of choral repertoire ranging from the Renaissance to modern, and all from memory.  The choir was first organized in 1984 by Mack Wilberg, who has also written a number of songs and arrangements specifically for the ensemble. When Wilberg left BYU in 1999 to become an assistant conductor for the Mormon Tabernacle Choir, Rosalind Hall was appointed to conduct the Concert Choir.

The choir has performed at the ACDA convention and with the Utah Symphony. The choir has released two albums on Tantara Records: "All Creatures of Our God and King" and "Beautiful River".  In 2006, the Concert Choir performed the premiere of two works by Mack Wilberg: "Till All Eternity Shall Ring," and "Dances to Life."

BYU Men's Chorus

The BYU Men's Chorus, the largest collegiate male choir in the United States, originally started in 1901 at BYU as "Male Glee". Anthony C. Lund directed the choir until the 1920s; then the choir came under the direction of Florence Jepperson Madsen and her husband, Franklin Madsen, with short periods under William F. Hanson and John R. Halliday. In 1955, the Male Chorus became an official class at BYU, conducted by Ralph Woodward, until his retirement in 1984. Mack Wilberg became the conductor of the ensemble in 1984, and the name was changed to Men's Chorus. The Men's Chorus increased its reputation and gained fame through performances on the BYU campus and on short tours, as well as through nationally broadcast videos. In 1999, Wilberg was replaced as choral director by Rosalind Hall.

The choir has performed at the ACDA conventions and performs frequently to sold-out audiences. The choir is limited to about 200 members. The repertoire frequently includes Latin and classical pieces, folk songs from various countries, music of the Church of Jesus Christ of Latter-day Saints (LDS Church), and well-known American pieces.

The choir released two albums of anthems, folk songs, and hymns under the direction of Wilberg (released by Deseret Book: Shout With Glory - 1995, and Awake My Soul - 1997). Under the direction of Hall, the choir has released three additional albums. "Praise Him", released by Tantara Records in 2005, was a third volume of anthems, folk songs, and hymns as a follow-up to the successful previous two albums. In 2013, another self-produced album, "Set Apart", was released in response to the increase in the number of missionaries serving, after the October 2012 announcement by Thomas S. Monson lowering the minimum age for service of missionaries. As a gift to missionaries and others throughout the world, it was determined that the album would be the first-ever album from a BYU choir released free of charge to the public as a download. In April 2020, Hall retired as director of Men's Chorus and Concert Choir with Brent Wells filling her position.

BYU Women's Chorus

The BYU Women's Chorus is made up of about 160 singers and performs a large number of concerts throughout the year. The choir was conducted by a number of different faculty and graduate students prior to 2004, when Jean Simons Applonie (who also founded and conducted the Utah-based women's choir Viva Voce) became the first faculty member to serve as its director. In 2008, the choir released its first solo recording "Wondrous Love" and has appeared on several albums featuring the combined choirs. The choir performed in the 2015 ACDA convention. In 2019, Sonja Poulter became the group's conductor.

Past choirs
The BYU Madrigal Singers were formed in 1952 under the direction of John R. Halliday. Halliday (1911–1988) had bachelor's and master's degrees in music from BYU and a Ph.D. from the Eastman School of Music. He also was an assistant director of the Mormon Tabernacle Choir under J. Spencer Cornwall. For the ten years before the forming of the Madrigal Singers, Halliday was the director of the BYU Bands. The Madrigal Singers toured extensively during the 1950’s. The BYU Oratorio Choir was formed in 1961, also under Halliday's direction, with the goal of performing oratorios, cantatas and similar large-scale ensemble pieces. Other BYU singing groups organized between 1951 and 1975 included the BYU Chamber Choir, the Golden Age Singers, the BYU A Cappella Choir, the BYU Opera Workshop Chorus, and Schola Cantorum. The BYU A Cappella Choir won the International Eisteddfod competition (Llangollen, Wales) in 1968, was named "Best International Choir" at the Linz Centennial Festival in 1972, and was the first non-Catholic choir to sing in the Notre Dame Cathedral in Paris.

The choirs in a combined setting 

The choirs perform together frequently throughout the year with a combined total of around 500 singers. Together, they perform a cappella, accompanied by keyboard or small instrumental ensemble, or with the BYU Philharmonic. They have performed Mahler's Second Symphony, Fauré's Requiem, Orff's Carmina Burana, and other major works. The choirs are often invited to provide music for sessions of the general conference of the Church of Jesus Christ of Latter-day Saints, which is broadcast worldwide. The combined choirs, along with the BYU Philharmonic, are featured in four separate hour-long PBS broadcasts: Thanksgiving of American Folk Hymns, Celebration of Christmas, Songs of Praise and Remembrance, and The Pilgrim's Journey Home.

Discography
 A Thanksgiving of American Folk Hymns (BYU Combined Choirs & Philharmonic - 1994) - available on CD and DVD
 A Celebration of Christmas (BYU Combined Choirs & Philharmonic - 1995) - available on CD and DVD
 The Redeemer (BYU Concert Choir, Singers & Philharmonic - 1996)
 We Sing of Christ (BYU Singers - 1997)
 All Creatures of Our God and King (BYU Concert Choir - 1999)
 Live at Carnegie Hall (BYU Singers - 1999)
 Songs of Praise and Remembrance (BYU Combined Choirs & Philharmonic - 2000) - available on CD and DVD
 Songs of the Soul (BYU Singers - 2000)
 I Believe this Is Jesus (BYU Singers - 2001)
 Eric Whitacre: The Complete A Cappella Works (BYU Singers - 2003)
 The Road Home (BYU Combined Choirs - 2003)
 Echoes of the Sabbath (BYU Combined Choirs & Philharmonic - 2003)
 My Redeemer Lives (BYU Singers - 2004)
 Mahler: Symphony No. 2 in C Minor, "Resurrection" (BYU Philharmonic & Combined Choirs - 2005)
 Praise Him (BYU Men's Chorus - 2005)
 The Restoration Oratorio by Merrill Bradshaw (first recorded in 1974; remastered and released as CD in 2005; BYU Combined Choirs & Philharmonic)
 Beautiful River (BYU Concert Choir - 2005)
 The Secret of Christmas (BYU Singers - 2007)
 Brigham Young University Choirs and Eric Whitacre 2 (BYU Singers, Concert Choir & Women's Chorus - 2008)
 Wondrous Love (BYU Women's Chorus - 2008)
 Live and Kicking (BYU Men's Chorus - 2009)
 O Peace of Christ (BYU Singers - 2010)
 The Pilgrim's Journey Home (BYU Combined Choir & Philharmonic - 2010)
 Celebration of Christmas: Merrily on High (Combined Choirs – 2011)
 I Stand All Amazed: Peaceful Hymns of Devotion (BYU Combined Choirs - 2012)
 Celebration of Christmas: There is a Star (Combined Choirs – 2012)
 Set Apart: Beloved Missionary Hymns (BYU Men's Chorus - 2013)
 Celebration of Christmas: Come, Lord Jesus (Combined Choirs – 2013)
 Celebration of Christmas: Lost in Wonder (Combined Choirs – 2013)
 Celebration of Christmas: Carol of Joy (Combined Choirs – 2015)
 Celebration of Christmas: Holy Night (Combined Choirs – 2016)
 Come and Sing to the Lord (BYU Singers – 2017)
 An Enduring Legacy: Dr. Ralph Woodward with the BYU A Cappella Choir, 1964–84 (BYU A Cappella Choir – 2018)
 Celebration of Christmas: Noel (BYU Combined Choirs – 2018)
 Rise, My Soul (BYU Women's Chorus - 2020)
 Celebration of Christmas: Angels Sing (Combined Choirs – 2020)
 Press Forward: Singing Through a Pandemic (BYU Combined Choirs – 2021)
 How Can I Keep from Singing: A Selection of Arrangements by Dr. Ronald Staheli for BYU Singers, 1984-2015 (BYU Singers – 2022)

References

External links

Concert Choir Website 
Men's Chorus Website
Singers Website
Women's Chorus Website
Rosalind Hall

Choirs in Utah
Brigham Young University
University choirs
Harold B. Lee Library-related University Archives articles